Brunswick Executive Airport  is a public use general aviation airport located two nautical miles (4 km) southeast of the central business district of Brunswick, a town in Cumberland County, Maine, United States. It is owned by the Midcoast Regional Redevelopment Authority.

The airport is located on the site of the former Naval Air Station Brunswick. The 2005 Base Realignment and Closure committee recommended the closure of NAS Brunswick. The airport was opened for civilian aircraft use in June 2011.

The airport is the central focus of Brunswick Landing: Maine's Center for Innovation, a business park.

Although most U.S. airports use the same three-letter location identifier for the FAA and IATA, this airport is assigned BXM by the FAA but has no designation from the IATA (which assigned BXM to Batom Airport in Indonesia). The airport's ICAO identifier is KBXM.

Facilities 
Brunswick Executive Airport covers an area of 720 acres (291 ha) at an elevation of 75 feet (23 m) above mean sea level. It has an asphalt paved runway, 1R/19L, measuring 8,000 by 200 feet (2,438 x 61 m). There is also former runway 1L/19R that is closed and now marked with an X. There also several closed taxiways.

See also
 Brunswick Naval Air Station

References

External links 
 
 
 

Airports in Cumberland County, Maine
Buildings and structures in Brunswick, Maine